The Purling Brook Falls or sometimes incorrectly Purlingbrook Falls, a horsetail waterfall on the Purling Brook, is located in the UNESCO World Heritagelisted Gondwana Rainforests in the South East region of Queensland, Australia.

Location and features

The Purling Brook Falls are situated within the central section of Springbrook National Park as part of the Shield Volcano Group, at Springbrook which is part of the Gold Coast hinterland, south-west of Surfers Paradise.

After heavy rains the falling waters creates a spectacle that attracts large numbers of tourists. At these times the danger from falling rocks during landslides can be hazardous so barricades are erected to prevent walking along tracks that pass the base of the falls.

See also

 List of waterfalls of Queensland

References

External links

Waterfalls of Queensland
Geography of Gold Coast, Queensland
Springbrook, Queensland